The Indian Creek Railroad  is a short-line railroad in Madison County, Indiana, United States.

The company's sole locomotive is an Alco RS-11 diesel numbered 6002, delivered new to the Southern Pacific Company in May 1959. The Indian Creek Railroad acquired it in 1982 and rebuilt it in 1996.

History
The trackage was part of a line between Richmond and Logansport, completed by the Cincinnati and Chicago Railroad in 1857. This eventually became part of the system of the Pennsylvania Railroad, which operated it as the Richmond Branch, the southern half of a main line between Cincinnati and Chicago. It last saw passenger service in 1971 as part of the Penn Central Transportation Company, and survived as a continuous freight line until the formation of Conrail in 1976. At that time, the Norfolk and Western Railway acquired most of the line south of New Castle. Much of the remainder, including the present Indian Creek Railroad, remained with the trustees of the bankrupt Penn Central. However, thanks to local funding, Conrail operated the short piece between the ex-New York Central Railroad Dow Secondary north of Anderson and Frankton under contract as the Indian Creek Secondary Track, named for a minor tributary of the White River that it crosses. (The first , mostly within yard limits, was acquired outright by Conrail, and went to the Norfolk Southern Railway in 1999.) The Indian Creek Railroad took over operations on July 20, 1980.

References

External links
Indian Creek Railroad

Indiana railroads
Transportation in Madison County, Indiana
Railway companies established in 1980
Switching and terminal railroads
Spin-offs of Conrail
1980 establishments in Indiana